Survival... Zero! (1970) is Mickey Spillane's eleventh novel featuring private investigator Mike Hammer.

Plot summary
This is the familiar Mike Hammer tale of a dead body found of someone considered a nonentity, leading to Mike Hammer combing the city trying to solve it – but in the background we hear increasingly about canisters filled with deadly bio-weapons which Soviet agents have left around New York.  Of course the two strands are going to entwine together, and Mike Hammer finds himself involved with a very nasty underground network conspiring to destroy the USA.

1970 American novels
Novels by Mickey Spillane
E. P. Dutton books
Mike Hammer (character) novels